Neodymium nickelate is a nickelate of neodymium with a chemical formula NdNiO3. In this compound, the neodymium atom is in the +3 oxidation state.

Preparation
Neodymium nickelate can be prepared by dissolving neodymium(III) oxide and nickel(II) oxide in nitric acid, followed by heating the mixture in an oxygen atmosphere.

It can also be prepared by pyrolyzing a mixture of nickel nitrate and neodymium nitrate.

It decomposes in high temperature (950 °C) by nitrogen:

4 NdNiO3 → 2 Nd2NiO4 + 2 NiO + O2

It can also be reduced to the monovalent nickel compound NdNiO2 by sodium hydride at 160 °C.

Physical properties
Neodymium nickelate shows metal-insulator transition (MIT) under low temperature. The temperature at which it transforms (TMIT) is 400K, which is higher than praseodymium nickelate (200K) but lower than samarium nickelate (460K). It transforms from antiferromagnetism to paramagnetism. It has demonstrated to be a first-order phase transition (this applies for praseodymium nickelate as well). The temperature (TN) can be changed by varying the NiO6 octahedral distortion. It is the only lathanide nickelate to have the same TMIT as TN.

Uses
In a 2010 study, it was found that neodymium nickelate as an anode material provided 1.7 times the current density of typical LSM anodes when integrated into a commercial SOEC and operated at 700 °C, and approximately 4 times the current density when operated at 800 °C. The increased performance is postulated to be due to higher "overstoichiometry" of oxygen in the neodymium nickelate, making it a successful conductor of both ions and electrons.

Neodymium nickelate can also be used in electrocatalysts, synapse transistors, photovoltaics, memory resistors, biosensors, and electric-field sensors.

See also
 Oxonickelates
 Neodymium
 Nickel
 Lanthanide

References

Neodymium compounds
Nickel compounds
Perovskites